List of museums in Washington may refer to:

 List of museums in Washington (state)
 List of museums in Washington, D.C.